The Cantata 700 is a commercial background music system and corresponding cartridge format developed by 3M that was in common use from 1965 until the 1990s.

Cartridge 
The nearly square-shaped cartridges are among the largest built. More than 24 hours of playback fits on a cartridge. The music distributed by 3M consisted of mono recordings some of which are attributed to the company's "3M Orchestra", with later editions featuring a themed blend of library music tracks and mostly instrumental cover versions of standard songs, and classical pieces arranged in a light or bright tempo. Cartridges such as the Italian and Polynesian editions include some  vocal content. The tape is ¼ inch wide and is played at 1⅞ inches per second. The cartridge consists of a reel-to-reel mechanism intended for playback only. Internally, the cartridge contains two 8⅜ inch tape reels, tape guides, rollers, and a reel brake. The reels are stacked on top of each other vertically and counter rotate during operation. After passing over the tape head, the tape loops over a roller in the cartridge to change its direction back to the takeup reel.

There were three main designs of cartridges manufactured, with a fourth minor modification. The earlier tapes (1965-mid 70s) use metal reels and the later tapes use plastic reels (mid 70s-1988). Muzak acquired the remaining unsold stock in 1986. Tapes manufactured before 1986 use scotch recording tape inside. Tapes sold by Muzak use a different formulation of tape more similar to type 1 cassette tape. Muzak tapes use 3M shells with Muzak labels over the top of the 3M labeling. The last tapes were sold in 1988. All information on the Cantata 700 was divested by 3M in 1988.

Machines 
All offered machines are playback only. The first models 94BG and 94BZ, were offered in 1965 and bundled with two cartridges of the customer's choice for US$429.00; . Each machine is equipped with a jack for 8 Ω speakers at a maximum of 6 W and a microphone jack for public address announcements.

The machines played continuously using an auto-reverse mechanism. As the tape reaches one end, the reverse mechanism activates and changes the drive direction. The tape head moves to the other side and the mechanism shifts pinch rollers. The design does not require the head to turn over; instead, the entire head changes position to play the tape at the other side of the tape path.

In 1970, 3M introduced the Cantata 700 Mark II, available only by lease.

Variety of Cartridges 
 Easy Listening IRL-SO8
 Variety Library V-168
 Rhythmic Library R-165
 Melodic Library 165
 Rhythmic Library Series II 266
 International Rhythmic Uptempo IR-169
 Polynesian Library P-166
 Fiesta Library F-807
 Rhapsody RH-185
 Rhapsody RH-295
 Bright & Lively BL-707
 Elegance EL-236
 Modified Rock Library 170
 Christmas Choral Library VX-167
 Christmas Rhythmic Library RX-266
 Christmas Melodic Library 165
 Contempo Library C-300
 Cavalcade CA-264
 Nashville NA-288
 Americana AM-76
 Smooth Reflections SR-419
 Uptempo U-825
 American Country A-169
 Zodiac Z-025
 Smooth & Easy SE-526
 Latin American Rhythmic Library LL-166
 Italian Library SI-200
 International Melodic IM-470
 French FG-622
 Big Band BB-630

References

External links 
 Techmoan: Retro Tech: This 1960s BGM Machine played the Biggest Cassettes ever made
 3M Cantata 700 (1965 – 1990s) at the Museum Of Obsolete Media
 Music of the 3M Cantata 700 in Archive

Industrial music services
3M
Tape recording
Audio storage
Audiovisual introductions in 1965
Discontinued media formats
1965 in music